William P. "Bill" Avery (born February 7, 1942) is a politician from the state of Nebraska in the Midwestern United States.  He served two terms in the Nebraska Legislature, from 2007 to 2015.  Avery is a retired adjunct professor of political science who specializes in international trade and foreign relations.

Born in Harnett County, North Carolina, he received his BS and M.A. from the University of Tennessee and his PhD from Tulane University. He is a professor emeritus at the University of Nebraska-Lincoln.

He was elected to the Legislature in 2006 representing Nebraska's 28th legislative district. He served on the Education Committee and the Government, Military and Veterans Affairs Committee, which he chaired. In 1991, Avery was elected to the Common Cause National Governing Board.

References

1942 births
Living people
American political scientists
Democratic Party Nebraska state senators
Tulane University alumni
University of Tennessee alumni
University of Nebraska–Lincoln faculty
People from Harnett County, North Carolina